Rubel Miya is a Bangladeshi footballer who plays as a left winger, right winger and sometimes as a striker. He currently plays for Muktijoddha Sangsad KC in Bangladesh Premier League.

Rubel was Man of The Final award winner of 2016 Independence Cup.

International goals

U19

Club
Sheikh Jamal DC

Dhaka Abahani

References

Living people
1995 births
Bangladeshi footballers
Bangladesh international footballers
Abahani Limited (Dhaka) players
Association football forwards